Tricosylic acid, or tricosanoic acid, is a 23-carbon long-chain saturated fatty acid with the chemical formula .

Natural occurrence 
Tricosylic acid occurs naturally in the leaves of Cecropia adenopus and in fennel. It also occurs in small quantities in the lipids of various other plants.

See also
List of saturated fatty acids
Very long chain fatty acids
List of carboxylic acids

References 

Fatty acids
Alkanoic acids